Asef Bayat is an Iranian-American scholar. He is currently the Catherine and Bruce Bastian Professor of Global and Transnational Studies and Professor of Sociology and Middle Eastern studies at University of Illinois at Urbana-Champaign.  He was previously Professor of Sociology and Middle Eastern studies and held the Chair of Society and Culture of the Modern Middle East at Leiden University, The Netherlands. He served as Academic Director of the International Institute for the Study of Islam in the Modern World (ISIM) and ISIM Chair of Islam and the Modern World at Leiden University (2003- 2009).

Bayat has published widely on issues of political sociology, social movements, urban space and politics, the everyday of politics and religiosity, contemporary Islam, and the Muslim Middle East. He has conducted extensive studies on the Iranian Islamic Revolution, Islamist movements in comparative perspective since the 1970s, the non-movements of the urban poor, Muslim youth, and women, the politics of fun, and the Arab Spring.

Biography 
Asef Bayat was born in a small village located approximately sixty miles west of Tehran in an Azerbaijani family. Later, his family moved to the capital city, where his first experience of schooling was with an Islamic institution. He obtained a diploma in a state-run high school, which was located close to the Hosseiniyeh Ershad, where many of Ali Shariati’s followers were gathering. In his last years of high school, he attended Shariati’s popular lectures in the Hosseiniyeh Ershad. However, by this time, he had become an entirely secular teenager, moving into leftist campus politics that he maintained throughout his higher education in the United Kingdom.

Academic career and contributions 
After completing his B.A. in Politics from the Faculty of Political and Social Sciences in Tehran (1977), Asef Bayat received his Ph.D. in Social Sciences – Sociology and Politics from the University of Kent from 1978 to 1984. He held a Post Doctoral Research Fellowship at the Center for Middle Eastern Studies at the University of California at Berkeley (1985).

Since 1986, he taught Sociology at the American University in Cairo for some 17 years in the course of which he also held positions at the University of California at Berkeley, Columbia University, and was Fellow of St. Antony's College, Oxford University(2000-1) and Brown University (2012).

He was the Professor of Sociology and Middle Eastern Studies and held the Chair of Society and Culture of the Modern Middle East at  Leiden University, The Netherlands from 2003-2010.

Since 2010 he has been Professor of Sociology and of Middle East Studies at University of Illinois and has held the Catherine and Bruce Bastian Chair of Global and Transnational Studies since 2012.

Bayat is the recipient of prestigious fellowships from the Guggenheim Foundation, Wissenschaftskolleg zu Berlin, Ford and MacArthur foundations.

Bayat coined the term, "post-Islamism" in a 1996 essay titled, "The Coming of the Post-Islamist Society." He further developed the idea in a subsequent book, 'Making Islam Democratic: Social Movement and the Post-Islamist Turn (Stanford University Press, 2007). He further refined the concept in collection with scholars of political Islam throughout the Muslim world titled, Post-Islamism: The Changing Faces of Political Islam(Oxford University Press, 2012). This idea has instigated intellectual and political debates in many Muslim majority countries, in particular Indonesia, Malaysia, Turkey, Egypt, Morocco and Iran.

Bayat has also contributed to social movement theory with his concepts of "quiet encroachment," "social non-movements," and the "politics of presence." These ideas have developed through the years and have culminated in his book, Life as Politics: How Ordinary People Change the Middle East (Stanford University Press, 2013). His understanding of the Arab Uprisings of 2010/2011, and the introduction of the concept, "Refolution," are presented in his recent book, Revolution without Revolutionaries: Making Sense of the Arab Spring (Stanford University Press, 2017).

Asef Bayat is fluent in English, Persian, Arabic, and Azeri.

Selected bibliography

Books 
Revolution without Revolutionaries: Making Sense of the Arab Spring Stanford University Press, 2017
Post-Islamism: The Changing Faces of Political Islam. Oxford University Press, 2013.
Being Young and Muslim: New Cultural Politics in the Global South and North. (co-edited with Linda Herrera.) New York: Oxford University Press, 2010.
Life as Politics: How Ordinary People Change the Middle East. Stanford: Stanford University Press, 2010, 2nd Edition 2013.
Making Islam Democratic: Social Movements and the Post-Islamist Turn. Stanford: Stanford University Press, 2007.
Ortadoğu'da Maduniyet: Toplumsal Hareketler ve Siyaset. [Subalternity in the Middle East: Social Movements and Politics. (In Turkish.) Six essays compiled and translated by Özgür Gökmen and Seçil Deren]. İstanbul: İletişim Yayınları, 2006.
Street Politics: Poor Peoples Movements in Iran. New York: Columbia University Press, 1997.
Work, Politics and Power. New York: Monthly Review Press, 1991.
Workers and Revolution in Iran. London: Zed Books, 1987.

Major articles (English) 

 Bayat, Asef (Fall 2017) Is There a Youth Politics?", Middle East Topics and Arguments.
 Bayat, Asef (October 2015) "Plebeians of the Arab Spring", Current Anthropology, vol. 56, no. 11.
 Bayat, Asef (2013) "The Making of Post-Islamist Iran", in A. Bayat, ed., Post-Islamism: The Changing Faces of Political Islam, New York, Oxford University Press.
 Bayat, Asef (2013) "Egypt and Its Unsettled Islamism", in A. Bayat, ed., Post-Islamism: The Changing Faces of Political Islam", New York, Oxford University Press.
 Bayat, Asef (April 2013) "Arab Spring and Its Surprises", Development and Change, vol. 44, issue 2.
 Bayat, Asef (2013) "Areas and Ideas", Comparative Studies of South Asia, Africa and the Middle East, vol. 33, no. 3.
 Bayat, Asef (2012) "Politics in the City Inside-Out", City and Society, vol. 24, no. 2 pp. 110–128.
 Bayat, Asef (2012) "Islamic Movements", in David Snow, et al. (eds.) Encyclopedia of Social and Political Movements, Oxford and New York, Blackwell.
 Bayat, Asef (2011) "Our Revolution is Civil", The Hedgehog Review, vol. 13, no. 3, Fall.
 Bayat, Asef (April 26, 2011) "The Post-Islamist Revolutions", Foreign Affairs.
 Bayat, Asef (2011) "Marginality: Curse or Cure?", in Ray Bush and Habib Ayeb (eds.) Marginality and Exclusion in Egypt, London, Zed Books.
 
  (London, Merlin Press, 2007.)
 
 
  Pdf.
 
 
 
 
 
  Pdf.
 
  Available online.

External links
 ISIM website https://web.archive.org/web/20050323233455/http://isim.nl/
 Publications in ISIM Repository 
 Interview Al-Ahram Weekly https://web.archive.org/web/20041212221109/http://weekly.ahram.org.eg/2003/645/profile.htm
 https://web.archive.org/web/20071228221358/http://islamuswest.org/books_Islam_and_the_West/
https://web.archive.org/web/20070629023213/http://www.sup.org/book.cgi?book_id=5594%205595%20
https://web.archive.org/web/20070515172412/http://www.vn.nl/web/show/id%3D184418/contentid%3D1729
http://www.kennislink.nl/web/show?id=161051
http://newhumanist
https://web.archive.org/web/20140518235342/http://oumma.com/La-democratisation-de-l-islam

References

1954 births
Living people
Iranian sociologists
Alumni of the University of Kent
Urban theorists
University of Illinois Urbana-Champaign faculty
Academic staff of Leiden University
People from Tehran